Renaldas Seibutis (born July 23, 1985) is a former Lithuanian professional basketball player. He represented the senior Lithuanian national team internationally.

Professional career

Europe
In the 2010–11 season, Seibutis played for Olin Edirne Basketbol where he has become one of the leaders of Olin, averaging 18.6 ppg, 3.5 rpg, 4.5 apg and 1.6 spg.

On June 12, 2011, Seibutis signed a three-year (2+1) contract with the Lithuanian team Lietuvos rytas.

In July 2014, he signed a contract with Turkish team Darüşşafaka Doğuş.

On September 4, 2015, Seibutis signed a one-year contract (with an option for another) with the Lithuanian club Žalgiris Kaunas.

On July 21, 2017, Seibutis signed with Neptūnas Klaipėda for the 2017–18 season.

On July 17, 2018, Seibutis signed a two-year deal with Zaragoza of the Liga ACB.

On August 11, 2021, Seibutis announced about end of his professional basketball career.

NBA
Seibutis was drafted in the second round with the 50th overall pick of the 2007 NBA draft by the Dallas Mavericks. Following the draft selection, he played with the Mavericks' NBA Summer League team in Las Vegas, averaging 6 points, 1 rebound, 1.6 assists, while shooting over 47% in 13 minutes per game over 5 games. He played again in 2008, averaging only 2 points in 10.9 minutes per game over 5 games. He was ultimately dropped from the 2008 roster because of his underperforming.

On July 23, 2018, the draft rights to Seibutis, along with Johnathan Motley, was traded to the Los Angeles Clippers in exchange for the draft rights to Maarty Leunen and cash considerations. On August 7, 2018, the draft rights to Seibutis, along with Sam Dekker, were traded to the Cleveland Cavaliers in exchange for the draft rights to Vladimir Veremeenko.

National team career
At the 2010 FIBA World Championship Seibutis played for the Lithuanian national basketball team, which won bronze medals. He also participated in his first Olympic Games in London 2012.

Career statistics

EuroLeague

|-
| style="text-align:left;"| 2005–06
| style="text-align:left;"| Olympiacos
| 23 || 3 || 17.8 || .440 || .303 || .821 || 1.9 || .6 || .6 || .0 || 6.3 || 4.6
|-
| style="text-align:left;"| 2007–08
| style="text-align:left;"| Olympiacos
| 3 || 0 || 2.9 || .000 || .000 || .000 || .3 || .3 || .3 || .0 || .0 || .7
|-
| style="text-align:left;"| 2012–13
| style="text-align:left;"| Lietuvos rytas
| 10 || 10 || 30.3 || .449 || .321 || .917 || 3.6 || 2.3 || 1.2 || .0 || 12.9 || 10.9
|-
| style="text-align:left;"| 2013–14
| style="text-align:left;"| Lietuvos rytas
| 10 || 5 || 26.5 || .404 || .423 || .909 || 2.5 || 3.2 || 1.2 || .0 || 10.7 || 9.4
|-
| style="text-align:left;"| 2015–16
| style="text-align:left;"| Žalgiris
| 21 || 17 || 22.2 || .462 || .319 || .822 || 2.3 || 1.5 || .2 || .1 || 8.0 || 4.7
|-
| style="text-align:left;"| 2016–17
| style="text-align:left;"| Žalgiris
| 30 || 9 || 12.3 || .408 || .208 || .760 || 1.3 || .9 || .3 || .1 || 2.5 || 1.5
|- class="sortbottom"
| style="text-align:left;"| Career
| style="text-align:left;"|
| 67 || 35 || 21.5 || .466 || .333 || .850 || 2.2 || 1.5 || .7 || .1 || 8.2 || 6.7

References

External links

Renaldas Seibutis at acb.com 
Renaldas Seibutis at eurobasket.com
Renaldas Seibutis at euroleague.net
Renaldas Seibutis at fiba.com
Renaldas Seibutis at tblstat.net

1985 births
Living people
2010 FIBA World Championship players
2014 FIBA Basketball World Cup players
2019 FIBA Basketball World Cup players
Basketball players at the 2012 Summer Olympics
Basketball players at the 2016 Summer Olympics
BC Rytas players
BC Neptūnas players
BC Žalgiris players
Bilbao Basket players
Dallas Mavericks draft picks
Darüşşafaka Basketbol players
Eskişehir Basket players
Greek Basket League players
Liga ACB players
Lithuanian expatriate basketball people in Greece
Lithuanian expatriate basketball people in Spain
Lithuanian expatriate basketball people in Turkey
Lithuanian men's basketball players
Maroussi B.C. players
Olympiacos B.C. players
Olympic basketball players of Lithuania
People from Palanga
Shooting guards